The Minister of Education is an appointment in the Cabinet of Sri Lanka.

List of Education Ministers

Parties

See also
 Ministry of Education

References

External links
 Ministry of Education
 Government of Sri Lanka

 
Education
Members of the Board of Ministers of Ceylon